Lindsay Haines Knapp (born February 25, 1970) is a former American football guard in the National Football League who played for both the Kansas City Chiefs and the Green Bay Packers. He was a member of the Packers' Super Bowl XXXI championship team.

Early life 
Knapp grew up in Deerfield, Illinois, where he was a standout athlete. He was an all-state lineman for Deerfield High School and won the Gatorade Player of the Year award for Illinois during his senior year. After high school, he attended Notre Dame, where he earned an MBA and was again a stand-out offensive lineman.

NFL career 
Knapp was drafted by Kansas City in the 5th round of the 1993 NFL Draft (130th overall). He played four years before being placed on waivers by Green Bay. He currently works as a bond salesman.

References

External links 
 "Catching up with our former athletes" 
 1993 draft results
 "PACKERS VISIT LOCAL HOSPITAL PEDIATRIC UNIT"

1970 births
Living people
People from Arlington Heights, Illinois
American football offensive guards
Notre Dame Fighting Irish football players
Kansas City Chiefs players
Green Bay Packers players
People from Deerfield, Illinois
Players of American football from Illinois